The Confluence Commercial Historic District is located in Eau Claire, Wisconsin. It was added to the National Register of Historic Places in 2007.

History
The area was first populated by French Canadian immigrants. Contributing buildings in the district were constructed from 1861 to 1936.

References

Commercial buildings on the National Register of Historic Places in Wisconsin
Eau Claire, Wisconsin
Historic districts on the National Register of Historic Places in Wisconsin
National Register of Historic Places in Eau Claire County, Wisconsin